Lady Cocoa (also known as Pop Goes the Weasel) is a 1975 low-budget American blaxploitation crime drama that was directed by Matt Cimber. With Lola Falana in the title role, the film also featured Millie Perkins, Alex Dreier, Gene Washington and Joe Greene. It was released by Moonstone Entertainment, and written by George Theakos.

Premise
The film tells the story of a woman (Lola Falana) who is released from jail for 24 hours prior to testifying against her ex-boyfriend (James A. Watson Jr.)

Reception
Linda Gross of the Los Angeles Times called Lady Cocoa "a slick, predictable, but well-made blaxploitation film." Joe Baltake, writing for the Philadelphia Daily News, complimented Falana's performance but called the film "a flimsy, boring situation comedy," concluding: "It's dumb, but Lola makes it palatable."

See also
 List of American films of 1975

References

External links
 

1975 films
Blaxploitation films
American crime drama films
1975 crime drama films
American independent films
Films directed by Matt Cimber
1975 independent films
1970s English-language films
1970s American films